Colin Leander Branch (born August 30, 1980) is a former professional American football safety in the National Football League (NFL). He graduated from Carlsbad High School in 1998.

Branch played college football at Stanford. As a senior in 2002, he was named Honorable Mention All-Pac-10 after compiling 69 tackles. Branch was drafted in the fourth round with the 119th pick of the 2003 NFL Draft by the Carolina Panthers. In 2004, Branch had 55 tackles and three interceptions for the Panthers, while starting 15 games. During the 2005 season, he suffered a knee injury, missing the season. Branch made 19 tackles and one interception in 2006, with four starts. He signed with the Oakland Raiders on June 8, 2007. Branch was released by them on August 27, 2007.

He is currently married to the former April Sage of North Charleston, South Carolina and they have four children together, sons Kendrick, Aaron and Salem Calvin (named after Colin's father, Calvin Stanley Branch, and brother Calvin Stanley Branch, Jr.), and daughter Sage.

References

Living people
1980 births
American football safeties
Carolina Panthers players
Stanford Cardinal football players
Players of American football from Cincinnati
Oakland Raiders players
Ed Block Courage Award recipients